Floyd Eugene Anderson (January 24, 1891 – February 17, 1976) was an American lawyer and politician from New York.

Life
He was born on January 24, 1891, in Bainbridge, Chenango County, New York, the son of Jesse L. Anderson and Abbie (Holcomb) Anderson. He graduated from Bainbridge High School; from Amherst College; and LL.B. from Syracuse University College of Law in 1914. He was admitted to the bar the same year, practiced law in Binghamton, and was an Assistant District Attorney of Broome County from 1919 to 1921. On November 26, 1914, he married Edna Madeline Mattice (born 1889), and their son was State Senator Warren M. Anderson (1915–2007).

Floyd Anderson was a member of the New York State Assembly (Broome Co., 1st D.) in 1941 and 1942. He was a member of the New York State Senate from 1943 to 1952, sitting in the 164th, 165th, 166th, 167th and 168th New York State Legislatures. He was appointed to the New York Supreme Court (6th D.), to fill a vacancy, on January 3; and resigned his seat on January 5, 1952. In November 1952, he was elected to succeed himself.

He died on February 17, 1976, at a nursing home in Binghamton, New York.

The Floyd E. Anderson Center for the Performing Arts at Binghamton University was named in his honor.

Sources

1891 births
1976 deaths
Politicians from Binghamton, New York
Republican Party New York (state) state senators
Republican Party members of the New York State Assembly
New York Supreme Court Justices
Syracuse University College of Law alumni
20th-century American judges
Lawyers from Binghamton, New York
20th-century American politicians
20th-century American lawyers